Kim Byong-Cheol, also known as Kim Byung Chul, is a South Korean Taekwondo practitioner. He won a gold medal for South Korea at the 1992 Summer Olympics in the Taekwondo featherweight division. Taekwondo was still considered a demonstration sport at that time.

Previous to his win at the Olympics, Kim won four other international taekwondo competitions: the World Championships in 1993 in New York,  the World University Games in 1990 in Santander, the World Games in 1989 in Karlsruhe, and the Taekwondo World Cup in 1989 in Cairo.

As of 2009, Kim had achieved the rank of 7th degree black belt, and he was managing  World Champion Taekwondo with locations in Portland, Beaverton and Scappoose, Oregon. Kim is the head instructor at the Portland location.

References

External links

 World Champion Taekwondo school website

Year of birth missing (living people)
Living people
South Korean male taekwondo practitioners
Olympic taekwondo practitioners of South Korea
Olympic gold medalists for South Korea
Taekwondo practitioners at the 1992 Summer Olympics
Medalists at the 1992 Summer Olympics
World Games medalists in taekwondo
World Games gold medalists
Competitors at the 1989 World Games
Universiade medalists in taekwondo
Universiade gold medalists for South Korea
Sportspeople from Beaverton, Oregon
World Taekwondo Championships medalists